Konstantinov and Konstantinova (feminine; Константинова) is a common Slavic surname that is derived from the baptismal name Konstantin and literally means Konstantin's.

People with this surname include:
Male
Aleko Konstantinov (1863–1897), Bulgarian writer
Alexander Konstantinov (1895–1945), Soviet inventor and scientist in the field of radiophysics 
Anatoly Konstantinov (1923–2006), Soviet aircraft pilot and Hero of the Soviet Union 
Boris Konstantinov (1910–1969), Soviet physicist, academician, and Hero of Socialist Labor
Evgeny Konstantinov (born 1981), Russian ice hockey player
Fyodor Konstantinov (1901–?), Soviet philosopher and academician
Julian Konstantinov (born 1966), Bulgarian operatic bass
Konstantin Konstantinov (1817 or 1819–1871), Russian scientist in the field of artillery, rocketry, instrument making, and automatics
Kosev Dimitr Konstantinov (1904–1996), Bulgarian historian and academician
Mikhail Konstantinov (1900–1990), Soviet general
Minkov Svetoslav Konstantinov (1902–1966), Bulgarian writer
Nikolay Konstantinov (1932–2021), Russian mathematics educator
Plamen Konstantinov (born 1973), Bulgarian volleyball player
Pyotr Konstantinov (1899–?), Soviet actor and People's Artist of the USSR
Pyotr Konstantinov (1877–1959), Soviet plant-breeder, selectionist, and academician
Vitali Konstantinov (born 1963), German artist and book illustrator
Vladimir Konstantinov (1921–1979), Soviet aircraft pilot and Hero of the Soviet Union
Vladimir Konstantinov (born 1967), former Russian professional hockey player

Female
Ina Konstantinova (1924–1944), Soviet World War II partisan and diarist
Galina Konstantinova (born 1940), Russian rower
Kseniya Konstantinova (1925–1943), Soviet nurse and Hero of the Soviet Union
Tamara Konstantinova (1919–1999), Soviet ground attack pilot and Hero of the Soviet Union
Fadel Emanouil Konstantinov (1995) Bulgarian financier and athlete.

See also
Konstantinov, a crater on the Moon, named after Konstantin Konstantinov
Konstantinov Kamen, a mountain in the Urals
Konstantinovsky (disambiguation)
Konstantinovka (disambiguation)

References
 

Bulgarian-language surnames
Patronymic surnames
Surnames from given names